Curimata is a genus of toothless characins from tropical South America, with 13 currently described species:
 Curimata acutirostris Vari & R. E. dos Reis, 1995
 Curimata aspera (Günther, 1868)
 Curimata cerasina Vari, 1984
 Curimata cisandina (W. R. Allen, 1942)
 Curimata cyprinoides (Linnaeus, 1766)
 Curimata incompta Vari, 1984
 Curimata inornata Vari, 1989
 Curimata knerii (Steindachner, 1876)
 Curimata macrops (C. H. Eigenmann & R. S. Eigenmann, 1889)
 Curimata mivartii (Steindachner, 1878)
 Curimata ocellata (C. H. Eigenmann & R. S. Eigenmann, 1889)
 Curimata roseni Vari, 1989
 Curimata vittata (Kner, 1858)

References

Curimatidae
Fish of South America